Annals of Nuclear Energy is a monthly peer-reviewed scientific journal covering research on nuclear energy and nuclear science. It was established in 1975 and is published by Elsevier.

The current editors-in-chief are Lynn E. Weaver (Florida Institute of Technology), S. Mostafa Ghiaasiaan (Georgia Institute of Technology) and Imre Pázsit (Chalmers University of Technology).

Abstracting and indexing
The journal is abstracted and indexed in:
 Chemical Abstracts Service
 Index Medicus/MEDLINE/PubMed
 Science Citation Index Expanded
 Current Contents/Engineering, Computing & Technology
 Scopus

According to the Journal Citation Reports, the journal has a 2013 impact factor of 1.020.

Former titles history
Annals of Nuclear Energy is derived from the following former titles:

Journal of Nuclear Energy (1954-1959)
Journal of Nuclear Energy. Part A. Reactor Science (1959-1961)
Journal of Nuclear Energy. Part B. Reactor Technology (1959)
Journal of Nuclear Energy. Parts A/B. Reactor Science and Technology (1961-1966)
Journal of Nuclear Energy (1967-1973)
Annals of Nuclear Science and Engineering (1974)
Annals of Nuclear Energy (1975–present)

Notes

References

External links 

Engineering journals
Elsevier academic journals
English-language journals
Monthly journals
Publications established in 1975